John Kyrle was an English philanthropist.

John Kyrle may also refer to:
John Kyrle High School
Sir John Kyrle, 1st Baronet (d. 1650) of the Kyrle Baronets
Sir John Kyrle, 2nd Baronet c. 1617-1680) of the Kyrle Baronets